Charles Michel (1832-1913) was an American ophthalmologist best known for publishing the first clinical report of successful electrology in 1875.

Early life and education
Michel was born in Charleston, South Carolina. He received an M.D. degree at the Medical College of the State of South Carolina (now known as Medical University of South Carolina) in 1857. During the Civil War he served in Confederate Army as a surgeon and medical inspector.

Career
After the war and until his death, Charles Michel spent practicing ophthalmology in St. Louis, Missouri. He eventually became a Professor of Ophthalmology at the Missouri Medical College and a surgeon and ophthalmic surgeon at Eye, Ear, Nose, and Throat Infirmary and at Martha Parsons Hospital for Children respectively, in St. Louis, Missouri.

Achievements
Michel was practicing in St. Louis, Missouri, when he began using a battery-powered needle epilator to treat trichiasis (ingrown eyelashes) in 1869. This direct current–powered method was called electrolysis because a chemical reaction in the hair follicle causes sodium hydroxide to form, which damages the follicle. Electrolysis is also sometimes called galvanic electrolysis.

References

1832 births
1913 deaths
American ophthalmologists
American surgeons
Medical University of South Carolina alumni
Washington University School of Medicine faculty
People from Charleston, South Carolina